

State-Owned
 Bulgarian National Radio
 Horizont
 Hristo Botev
 Radio Bulgaria

Local radio stations operated by BNR:
 Radio Plovdiv 
 Radio Varna 
 Radio Stara Zagora 
 Radio Shumen 
 Radio Blagoevgrad
 Radio Sofia
 Radio Vidin
 Radio Burgas

Private
 Bulgaria on air
 BG Radio - Bulgarian music only 
 City Radio  - new music.
 Classic FM
 Darik Radio - news radio
 Magic FM - soft ac
 FM+ first private radio in Bulgaria.
 Focus
 Fresh -  popular radio - Today's Hits! 
 Veronica - Bulgarian pop-folk and balkan music
 Jazz FM
 Melody Radio - songs from 70's, 80's, 90's and few new songs
 Nova News 
 NRJ  - songs from 90's and new  music
 N-JOY
 bTV Radio
 Radio 1 - oldies music from 70's, 80's and 90's and a few new songs.
 Radio Nova - house music
 Radio Vitosha -mainly new songs and a few songs from the 90's
 Radio 1 Rock rock music from 80's and 90's
 The Voice  - new music
 Veselina - Bulgarian pop-folk music and sometimes dance music
 Z-Rock
 Новините сега - news radio without music
 Autoradio - new pop and dance music

External links
 CHEcast.com : Database of all radio stations in Bulgaria 
 OnlineRadioBG.com : All Bulgarian radio stations online

Bulgaria